Special use airspace (SUA) is an area designated for operations of a nature such that limitations may be imposed on aircraft not participating in those operations.  Often these operations are of a military nature.  The designation of SUAs identifies for other users the areas where such activity occurs, provides for segregation of that activity from other users, and allows charting to keep airspace users informed of potential hazards. Most SUAs are depicted on aeronautical charts and FAA maintains a page showing the current status of most SUAs.

Special use airspace includes: restricted airspace, prohibited airspace, military operations areas (MOA), warning areas, alert areas, temporary flight restriction (TFR), national security areas, and controlled firing areas, typically up to FL180 or 18,000 ft above sea level. In addition there is often an Air Traffic Control Assigned Airspace (ATCAA) from FL180 through FL600 in which ATC plans for military operations. ATCAAs are generally not depicted on charts because flights above FL180 are subject to mandatory instrument flight rules operation requiring continuous contact with ATC. Alert areas may contain high volume of pilot training or an unusual type of aerial activity. MOAs (located over land) and warning areas (located over domestic or international waters or both) and training routes contain high volumes of military activity.

Flights within restricted areas are only allowed with specific FAA clearance and may be subject to restrictions, while in prohibited areas flights are forbidden except in emergency situations.  Flying in MOAs or Warning Areas is allowed by non-military aircraft without clearance, but can be hazardous.

References

Air traffic control
Military aviation